Iara or IARA may refer to:

Iara (mythology), a figure from Brazilian mythology
Iara, Cluj, a commune in Cluj County, Romania
Iara (Arieș), a tributary of the Arieș in Cluj County, Romania
Iara, a tributary of the Petrilaca in Mureș County, Romania

 Iara, Madagascar, a town and commune
Iara Oil Field, off the coast of Brazil 
Institute for Anthropological Research in Africa, Katholieke Universiteit Leuven, Belgium
Islamic American Relief Agency
Increasing absolute risk aversion, used in economics, finance, and decision theory
Iara Lee (born 1966), Brazilian film producer, director and activist